Visa requirements for Nigerien citizens are administrative entry restrictions by the authorities of other states placed on citizens of the Niger. As of 2 July 2019, Nigerien citizens had visa-free or visa on arrival access to 54 countries and territories, ranking the Nigerien passport 90th in terms of travel freedom (tied with a passport from Mali) according to the Henley Passport Index.

Visa requirements map

Visa requirements

Dependent, Disputed, or Restricted territories
Unrecognized or partially recognized countries

Dependent and autonomous territories

See also

Visa policy of Niger
Nigerien passport

References and Notes
References

Notes

Niger
Foreign relations of Niger